Forgotten Toys is the debut studio album by David Paich, keyboardist/vocalist of the American rock band Toto. In 2022, Paich announced his debut solo album and it was released by the Players Club (Mascot Label Group) on August 19, 2022. On June 9, 2022 he released the first single titled "Spirit of the Moonrise". Paich said he plans to release more in the future and he has "some stuff lying around here", and is often "slow" because he is "methodical and a perfectionist, sometimes too much...".

Background 
During the initial COVID-19 lockdowns in 2020, Paich revisited some old songs and ideas that he had "carried in his head for years". This is where the title of the album comes from. This album features Joseph Williams as co-producer and sometimes co-vocalist, Steve Lukather, Brian Eno, Michael McDonald, Ray Parker Jr., Don Felder, and Steve Jordan. "All the Tears That Shine" was originally featured on the 2015 Toto album Toto XIV, which featured David Paich on vocals. This version of the song features co-writer Michael Sherwood on vocals. Paich said that the album art was done by his wife, Lorraine, who was inspired after hearing Paich's original title for the album, 'Broken Toys'. She has previous experience in tabletop design for food commercials and was previously a food stylist.

Critical reception

Forgotten Toys received some positive reviews from music critics. Lee Zimmerman of American Songwriter described the album as "a surprisingly cohesive and well-constructed set of songs", making it a "pleasure to peruse". Classic Rocks Phoebe Flys called the album "a masterfully produced celebration of a lifetime’s musical kinship" and highlighted that it includes "yacht rock’s most talented peer group" in its lineup.

Track listing

Personnel
Musicians
 David Paich – lead vocals , keyboards , piano , organ , bass , synth 
 Gregg Bissonette – drums 
 Lenny Castro – percussion 
 Robin DiMaggio – drums and percussion 
 Jon Diversa – horns 
 Nathan East – bass guitar 
 David Hungate – bass guitar 
 Brian Eno – synthesizer 
 Don Felder – slide guitar 
 Fredrik Halland – electric guitar , background vocals , additional electric guitar and electric bass 
 Warren Ham – saxophone , flute , harmonica 
 Davey Johnstone – acoustic and electric guitars 
 Steve Jordan – drums 
 Pat Knox – background vocals 
 Michael Lang – acoustic piano 
 Steve Lukather – electric guitar , electric guitar solo 
 Michael McDonald – background vocals 
 Monét Owens – background vocals 
 Elizabeth Paich – background vocals 
 Ray Parker Jr. – guitar 
 Dean Parks – acoustic and electric guitars 
 Billy Sherwood – background vocals 
 Michael Sherwood – lead vocals 
 James Tormé – background vocals and scatting 
 Mike Valerio – upright bass 
 Hannah Williams – background vocals 
 Joseph Williams – lead vocals , background vocals , keyboards , synth , drum programming 
 Ray Williams – background vocals 

Technical personnel
 Joseph Williams – engineer 
 Pat Knox – engineer , additional engineering 
 Stefan Nordin – engineer 
 Frank Rosato – additional engineering 
 Julian Chan – additional engineering 
 Bob Clearmountain – mixing
 Ken Freeman – additional mixing 
 Bernie Grundman – mastering

Charts

References

2022 debut albums
Rock albums by American artists
Mascot Label Group albums